The 2009–10 B Group was the 55th season of the Bulgarian B Football Group, the second tier of the Bulgarian football league system. The season started on 8 August 2009 and finished on 23 May 2010 with the A Group promotion play-off between the runners-up from both divisions.

East B Group

Teams

 1Only 15 teams will compete in the East B PFG this season due to no team from the Bulgarian North-East V AFG being promoted. Both the champions FC Orlovets Pobeda and runners-up FC Benkovski Bjala refused to participate in the Second Division and chose instead to continue to compete in the Third Division.

Final standings

Top goalscorers
Source:

West B Group

Teams

Final standings

Top goalscorers

Promotion play-off

References

External links
 Bulgaria B PFG at Soccerway
 Bulgarian League- season 2009/10 at RSSSF

Second Professional Football League (Bulgaria) seasons
2009–10 in Bulgarian football
Bulgaria